was a Japanese poet, novelist, and translator. He was a member of the Japan Art Academy.

Biography
Born in Okayama City, Iijima graduated from the French Literature Department of Tokyo University. While in university he established together with, among others, Isamu Kurita the magazine Cahier. In 1956, he and Makoto Ōoka were among the founders of the Surrealism Research Society.

In 1953, he published his first collection of poems, Tanin no sora ("Another person's sky").  In 2008, he was elected a member of the Japan Art Academy.  He also worked as a professor at Meiji University and Kokugakuin University.  He translated or wrote about Henri Barbusse, Antonin Artaud, Brassaï, Joan Miró i Ferrà, Henry Miller, Marcel Aymé, Guillaume Apollinaire, etc.

He died on October 14, 2013, at a Tokyo hospital of malabsorption syndrome.

Personal life
He is the father of architecture critic Yōichi Iijima.

Awards
Takami Jun Award for ゴヤのファースト・ネームは (Goya no first name wa) (1974)
Tōson kinen rekitei Award for 飯島耕一詩集 (Iijima Kōichi shishũ) (1978)
Gendai shijin Award for 夜を夢想する小太陽の独言 (Yoru wo musōsuru shotaiyō no dokugen) (1983)
Bunkamura Prix des Deux Magots for 暗殺百美人 (Ansatsu hyaku bijin) (1996)
Yomiuri Prize for アメリカ (America) (2005)
Nihon gendai ishika bungakukan Award (2005)

References

1930 births
2013 deaths
Japanese translators
Japanese scholars of French literature
20th-century Japanese poets
20th-century Japanese novelists
21st-century Japanese novelists
20th-century translators
Deaths from digestive disease